Curetis brunnea is a species of butterfly in the lycaenid subfamily Curetinae. It was described by Alfred Ernest Wileman in 1909 as Curetis acuta var. brunnea.

Distribution
The type locality of Curetis brunnea is on Taiwan. The species is also distributed from the eastern coast of China to the Himalayas.

Appearance
The species was described by Wileman as being almost entirely brown, with a faint red area that may be visible on the hindwings, and having an expanse of 46 to 48 mm.

Notes and references

Curetis
Butterflies of Asia
Butterflies described in 1909